Thiago Medeiros (born July 24, 1982 in São Paulo) is a Brazilian racing driver.

After racing in Formula Three Sudamericana from 1999 to 2002, finishing 3rd in 2001 and 4th in 2002, he came to the United States in 2003 to race in the Infiniti Pro Series for Genoa Racing. He started his first race from the pole at Homestead Miami Speedway and captured his first victory in the final race of the season at Texas Motor Speedway. He switched to Sam Schmidt Motorsports in 2004 and had a dream season, albeit in a season where the field of most races was very small. Medeiros captured six wins, all from the pole, on his way to the championship.

He attempted to make his IndyCar Series debut in the last race of the 2005 season at California Speedway for Dreyer & Reinbold Racing. However, he crashed in practice and could not make a qualifying attempt or participate in the race. He returned to the series and attempted to qualify for the 2006 Indianapolis 500 in a car fielded by PDM Racing, his USAC Silver Crown Series team.  On Bump Day, he made the grid taking the 33rd and final spot on the grid and finished 31st in the race after an electrical problem.

He returned to his native Brazil to drive in Stock Car Brasil. Thiago quit motoracing in 2007 and started a new career flying helicopters. He currently lives in Dubai.

Racing record

American open-wheel racing results
(key)

Indy Pro Series

IRL IndyCar Series

Indianapolis 500

External links
Full American Open Wheel Racing results on ChampCarStats.com
Thiago Medeiros driver summary on Driver Database

Brazilian racing drivers
Stock Car Brasil drivers
IndyCar Series drivers
Brazilian IndyCar Series drivers
Indianapolis 500 drivers
Indy Lights champions
Indy Lights drivers
Formula 3 Sudamericana drivers
1982 births
Living people
USAC Silver Crown Series drivers

Arrow McLaren SP drivers
AFS Racing drivers
Dreyer & Reinbold Racing drivers
PDM Racing drivers